Pelican Lake is a natural lake in South Dakota, in the United States. The north-east shore of the lake is part of Watertown, South Dakota.

Pelican Lake takes its name from the pelican, which is still a common migratory bird in the state.

See also
List of lakes in South Dakota

References

Lakes of South Dakota
Lakes of Codington County, South Dakota
Watertown, South Dakota